Kimwaua Makin (born 8 August 1997) is a male Kiribati sprinter. He competed in the Men's  100 metres event at the 2015 World Championships in Athletics in Beijing, China, finishing seventh in his heat.  He ran his personal best of 11.77 at the 2014 Summer Youth Olympics.

See also
 Kiribati at the 2015 World Championships in Athletics

References

1997 births
Living people
Place of birth missing (living people)
I-Kiribati male sprinters
World Athletics Championships athletes for Kiribati
Athletes (track and field) at the 2014 Summer Youth Olympics